Plummer is a city in Benewah County, Idaho, United States. The population was 1,044 at the 2010 census, up from 990 in 2000. It is the largest city within the Coeur d'Alene Reservation, and is accessed by U.S. Route 95, the state's primary north–south highway.

History
The city's first church was built in 1912.

Geography

Parks and recreation
The Trail of the Coeur d'Alenes is a  rail trail that runs between Plummer and Mullan and passes through Heyburn State Park to the east, Harrison, and Cataldo along the way.

Climate
Plummer has a dry-summer humid continental climate (Dsb) according to the Köppen climate classification system.

Demographics

2010 census

As of the census of 2010, there were 1,044 people, 374 households, and 261 families residing in the city. The racial makeup of the city was 45.7% White, 1.1% African American, 42.7% Native American, 0.1% Pacific Islander, 0.7% from other races, and 9.8% from two or more races. Hispanic or Latino of any race were 8.0% of the population.

There were 374 households, of which 43.3% had children under the age of 18 living with them, 41.7% were married couples living together, 15.2% had a female householder with no husband present, 12.8% had a male householder with no wife present, and 30.2% were non-families. 25.4% of all households were made up of individuals, and 10.9% had someone living alone who was 65 years of age or older. The average household size was 2.78 and the average family size was 3.27.

The median age in the city was 31.4 years. 32.8% of residents were under the age of 18; 9.6% were between the ages of 18 and 24; 22.3% were from 25 to 44; 24.8% were from 45 to 64; and 10.3% were 65 years of age or older. The gender makeup of the city was 51.1% male and 48.9% female.

2000 census
As of the census of 2000, there were 990 people, 336 households, and 257 families residing in the city. The racial makeup of the city was 55.86% White, 0.71% African American, 39.29% Native American, 0.10% Asian, 0.10% Pacific Islander, 0.81% from other races, and 3.13% from two or more races. Hispanic or Latino of any race were 2.93% of the population.

There were 336 households, out of which 38.4% had children under the age of 18 living with them, 49.4% were married couples living together, 17.3% had a female householder with no husband present, and 23.5% were non-families. 19.6% of all households were made up of individuals, and 8.0% had someone living alone who was 65 years of age or older.  The average household size was 2.95 and the average family size was 3.33.

In the city, the population was spread out, with 33.3% under the age of 18, 12.2% from 18 to 24, 26.6% from 25 to 44, 17.6% from 45 to 64, and 10.3% who were 65 years of age or older.  The median age was 29 years. For every 100 females, there were 96.8 males.  For every 100 females age 18 and over, there were 88.6 males.

The median income for a household in the city was $28,438, and the median income for a family was $31,806. Males had a median income of $26,583 versus $20,357 for females. The per capita income for the city was $10,564.  About 17.3% of families and 22.0% of the population were below the poverty line, including 23.8% of those under age 18 and 18.8% of those age 65 or over.

Notable people
 Paulette Jordan, State Representative

References

External links
  - City of Plummer
 FYI North Idaho.com - Worley / Plummer

Cities in Benewah County, Idaho
Cities in Idaho